The Faroese Sheepdog is a breed of dog from the Faroe Islands, rather described as a landrace than a modern breed. It may be related to the Icelandic Sheepdog.

Appearance 
The Faroese Sheepdog looks a lot like the Border Collie.

Behaviour 
The Faroese Sheepdog catches a sheep by a foreleg or the shoulder and holds it until it has been brought to the ground.

History 
The breed's ancestors were Norse dogs that crossed with indigenous local dogs (which were probably originally brought there by Irish and Scottish monks). In addition, Collie type dogs (especially Border Collies) had a great influence on the development of the breed.

See also
 Dogs portal
 List of dog breeds

Sources 

Dog landraces
Dog breeds originating in Denmark
Herding dogs
Rare dog breeds